Beverly Hills Buntz is an American comedy-drama television series and a spin-off of the acclaimed police drama Hill Street Blues.  Beverly Hills Buntz aired on NBC from November 5, 1987, to May 20, 1988.

Overview
The show was a half-hour dramedy, a hybrid between light private eye fare and a sitcom.  The main character, Norman Buntz, was previously seen as a morally and ethically questionable cop on Hill Street Blues, which was a dramatic series (this series is one of a handful of examples of a series in one genre, drama, spinning off a series in another: comedy). The series has the character quitting the police force, moving to Beverly Hills, and becoming a private investigator. In a programming experiment, NBC president Brandon Tartikoff announced that this show would be a "designated hitter" and was originally given prize time slots once a month following Cheers and Night Court.  The other two "designated hitters" that season were the Bruce Weitz and Nancy Walker sitcom, Mama's Boy, and the second season of the Edward Asner drama The Bronx Zoo (incidentally, each show would be canceled the following year). Eventually, Buntz was scheduled Fridays at 9:30pm between Night Court and Miami Vice in March 1988.  Night Court and Buntz were unsuccessful, but Miami Vice gained a fifth season with an improved performance having moved from 9pm back to 10pm.

Three pilots of Buntz were filmed including one by director Hal Ashby.

Thirteen episodes were filmed, of which only nine were broadcast.  The first episode was broadcast November 5, 1987 and the last on May 20, 1988.  The series starred Dennis Franz as Norman Buntz, and Peter Jurasik as Sid "The Snitch" Thurston.  Dana Wheeler-Nicholson joined the cast.

Cast
Dennis Franz as Norman Buntz
Peter Jurasik as Sid Thurston
Dana Wheeler-Nicholson as Rebecca Griswold

Episodes

References

External links
 

1980s American crime television series
1980s American sitcoms
1987 American television series debuts
1988 American television series endings
American crime comedy television series
English-language television shows
NBC original programming
Television shows set in Beverly Hills, California
American television spin-offs
Television series by MTM Enterprises
Television series created by David Milch